"Last Time That I Checc'd" is a song by American rapper Nipsey Hussle, released on January 19, 2018 as the second single from his album Victory Lap (2018). It features YG and is his first single to chart on the Billboard Hot 100.

Music video 
Directed by Sergio and Blacsam, the music video features Nipsey Hussle riding and hanging out of a Lamborghini through the streets of Los Angeles, being chased by police escorts. In another setting he performs in front of a blue wall with the Lamborghini, which is white, while YG performs in front of a red wall beside him with a black Lamborghini.

Usage in Media 
The song was used as the entrance theme for the Los Angeles Rams at home games during the 2021 season, including Super Bowl LVI which was played at the Rams' home SoFi Stadium.

Charts

Certifications

References 

2018 singles
2018 songs
Nipsey Hussle songs
YG (rapper) songs
Songs written by YG (rapper)
Songs written by Christopher Brody Brown
Songs written by Larrance Dopson
Songs written by Nipsey Hussle